Shanley is a surname of Irish origin, anglicised from any of the following Gaelic phrases: 
 Mac Seanlaoich meaning 'son of Seanlaoch' 
Ní Sheanlaoich possibly meaning 'descendant of a daughter Seanlaoch'
 Nic Sheanlaoich meaning 'daughter of Seanlaoch'
 Ó Seanlaoich possibly meaning 'descendant of a son of Seanlaoch'

Those bearing it include the following:
 American Catholic priests: 
Brian J. Shanley, priest of the Order of Preachers & president of Providence College
Paul Shanley (1931–2020), defrocked priest and convicted child-rapist
 Others:
Barry Shanley (born 1946), American news anchor and journalist
Bernard M. Shanley (1903–1992), associate of U.S. President Eisenhower
 Charles Dawson Shanly (1811–1875), Irish-American writer and journalist
Eleanor Shanley, Irish vocalist
Frank Shanley (1889–1917), English footballer
Francis R. Shanley (1904 – 1968), professor of engineering at the University of California, developed a theory of the strength of inelastic columns
Gib Shanley (1931–2008), sports anchor/reporter
John Patrick Shanley (born 1950), American playwright
Mai Shanley (born c. 1963),  beauty queen
Mary Shanley (1896–1989), New York City police detective
Mary Lyndon Shanley (born 1944), feminist legal scholar

Fictional characters 
 Cal Shanley on  US television series Studio 60 on the Sunset Strip, played by Timothy Busfield

See also 
 The medieval Sept  and Town of Mac Shanley are mentioned in the Irish Annals.

Surnames

Irish families
Surnames of Irish origin
People of Conmaicne Maigh Nissi